Valerio Donnianni (born 16 January 1960) is an Italian former sports shooter. He competed at the 1988 Summer Olympics and the 1992 Summer Olympics.

References

External links
 

1960 births
Living people
Italian male sport shooters
Olympic shooters of Italy
Shooters at the 1988 Summer Olympics
Shooters at the 1992 Summer Olympics
People from Vercelli
Sportspeople from the Province of Vercelli
20th-century Italian people